Eva Antonie Kløvstad, née Jørgensen (10 July 1921 – 8 June 2014) was a Norwegian resistance member and Milorg leader from World War II.

She was born in Vang, Hedmark, a daughter of Frithjof Georg Jørgensen and Thorbjørg Jenny Godager. During the occupation of Norway by Nazi Germany she took part in resistance work in Hamar. From 1944 she served as assistant for the leader of Milorg district 25 (D-25), who was shot by the Gestapo later in 1944. From December 1944 she was the de facto leader of Milorg D-25, a district which had about 1,200 underground soldiers. She died in 2014.

Further reading

References

1921 births
2014 deaths
People from Hamar
Norwegian resistance members
Female resistance members of World War II
Norwegian women in World War II